Sabine is a rural locality in the Toowoomba Region, Queensland, Australia.

History 
The locality takes its name from its former railway station, named by the Queensland Railways Department, after a pioneer land selector called Sabine.

Sabine State School opened on 15 April 1925. It closed on circa 1937.

Road infrastructure
The Oakey–Cooyar Road runs along the eastern boundary.

References 

Toowoomba Region
Localities in Queensland